Inge and the Millions is a 1933 German comedy film directed by Erich Engel and starring Brigitte Helm, Carl Esmond, and Paul Wegener. Produced by UFA, it was shot at the Babelsberg Studios in Potsdam. The film's sets were designed by Otto Erdmann and Hans Sohnle. Location filming took place in Berlin and around Lake Constance.

In line with the policies of the new Nazi government, the film was fiercely anti-capitalist and attacked Jewish financial speculators in particular.

Cast

References

Bibliography

External links 
 

1933 films
1933 comedy films
Films of Nazi Germany
German comedy films
1930s German-language films
Films directed by Erich Engel
UFA GmbH films
German black-and-white films
1930s German films
Films shot at Babelsberg Studios